The Committee of Union and Progress (CUP), later the Union and Progress Party, was a secret revolutionary organization and political party active between 1889 and 1926 in the Ottoman Empire and the Republic of Turkey. The foremost faction within the Young Turk movement, it instigated the 1908 Young Turk Revolution, which ended absolute monarchy and began the Second Constitutional Era. From 1913 to 1918, the CUP ruled the empire as an authoritarian one-party state and committed genocides against the Armenian, Greek, and Assyrian peoples as part of a broader policy of ethnic erasure during the late Ottoman period. The CUP was associated with the wider Young Turk movement, and its members have often been referred to as Young Turks, although the movement produced other political parties as well.

Beginning as a liberal reform movement, the organization was persecuted and forced into exile by the Ottoman sultan Abdul Hamid II's autocratic government because of its calls for democratization, secularization, and reform in the empire. Inspired by revolutionary groups such as the Armenian Revolutionary Federation and Internal Macedonian Revolutionary Organization, by 1906 the CUP had developed into a clandestine revolutionary group, infiltrating Ottoman army contingents based in Rumelia which were fighting ethnic insurgents in the Macedonian Struggle. In 1908, the Unionists forced Abdul Hamid to reinstate the Ottoman Constitution in the Young Turk Revolution, ushering in an era of political plurality. Mehmed Talât established himself as the leader of the CUP after the revolution, and it developed into a political party following a Turkish nationalist ideology known as İttihadism. Its main rival was the Freedom and Accord Party, another Young Turk party which called for the federalization and decentralization of the empire, in opposition to the CUP's desire for a centralized and unitary Turkish-dominated state.

The CUP consolidated its power at the expense of the Freedom and Accord Party in the 1912 "Election of Clubs" and the 1913 Raid on the Sublime Porte, while also growing increasingly splintered, radical and nationalistic due to defeat in the Balkan Wars. The CUP seized power following Grand Vizier Mahmud Şevket Pasha's assassination, with major decisions ultimately being decided by the party's Central Committee. A triumvirate of CUP leader Talât Pasha, Enver Pasha and Cemal Pasha, took control over the country, and sided with Germany in World War I. With the help of their paramilitary, the Special Organization, the İttihadist regime enacted policies resulting in the destruction and expulsion of the empire's Armenian, Greek, and Assyrian citizens in order to Turkify Anatolia.

Following Ottoman defeat in WWI, its leaders escaped into exile in Europe, where many were assassinated in Operation Nemesis in revenge for their genocidal policies, including Talât and Cemal Pasha. Many CUP members were court-martialed and imprisoned in war-crimes trials by a rehabilitated Freedom and Accord Party with support from Sultan Mehmed VI and the Allied powers. However, most former Unionists were able to join the burgeoning Turkish nationalist movement led by Mustafa Kemal Atatürk, ultimately continuing their political careers in Turkey as members of Atatürk's Republican People's Party. Nationalist and also social reforms introduced by Union and Progress were expanded on by the Republican People's Party, which continued one party rule in Turkey until 1946.

Name 
The CUP was first established as the Committee of the Ottoman Union (Ottoman Turkish: İttihad-ı Osmanî Cemiyeti) in Constantinople (now Istanbul) on 6 February 1889 by a group of medical students of the Imperial Military School of Medicine. Between 1906 and 1908 it was known as the Committee of Progress and Union (CPU), but changed its name back to the more recognizable Committee of Union and Progress (CUP) during the Young Turk Revolution.

In the West, the CUP was conflated with the wider Young Turks movement and its members were called Young Turks, while in the Ottoman Empire its members were known as İttihadçı or Komiteci, which means İttihadist (Unionist) and Committeeman respectively. Its ideology is known as İttihadçılık, or İttihadism (literally Unionism). The Central Committee informally referred to itself as the "Sacred Committee" (Cemiyet-i mukaddese) or the "Kaaba of Liberty" (Kâbe-i hürriyet).

Origins (1889–1906) 
The Committee of Ottoman Union, soon renamed as the Committee of Union and Progress, was a Young Turks organization founded in 1889 by Ibrahim Temo, Dr. Mehmed Reşid, Abdullah Cevdet, and İshak Sükuti, all of whom were medical students of the Imperial Military School of Medicine in Constantinople. The Young Turks believed that to maintain the multi-national empire a social contract was necessary in the form of bringing back the Constitution. Sultan Abdul Hamid II promulgated the Constitution and a parliament upon his ascension to the throne in 1876, but suspended both after defeat in the 1877-1878 Russo Turkish War. From 1878 to 1908, Abdul Hamid ruled the empire as a personal dictatorship. Therefore the Young Turks hoped to overthrow Abdul Hamid for one of his brothers: either future Sultan Mehmed V or former Sultan Murad V.

The CUP became the preeminent faction of the Young Turks movement once it established contact with exiled Young Ottomans intellectuals and rapidly gained membership, but after a failed putsch against the sultan in August 1896, it was repressed and most of its members fled into exile to Paris, London, Geneva, Bucharest, and British occupied Egypt. A congress in November split the organization between Ahmed Rıza's Paris CUP branch and Mizancı Murat's Geneva CUP branch. After the Ottoman Empire's triumph over Greece in 1897 Sultan Abdul Hamid used the prestige he gained from the victory to coerce the exiled Young Turks network back into his fold. Cevdet, Sükuti, and Mizancı Murat accepted, leaving Ahmet Rıza in Paris as leader of the exiled Young Turks network and the CUP. Rıza was a more moderate member of the CUP, as well as an avid follower of positivist theory. Rıza called for the reinstatement of the constitution but without revolution, as well as a more centralized Turkish-dominated Ottoman Empire sovereign of European influence. In Paris, Ahmed Rıza continued resistance against the Hamidian government through his newspaper Meşveret which was published in French and (Ottoman) Turkish.

Another set back for the Young Turks came in 1901, when members of the Ottoman dynasty Damat Mahmud Pasha and his sons Sabahaddin and Lütfullah fled to Europe to join the Young Turks. Prince Sabahaddin created a division within the exiled Young Turks. Inspired by Anglo-Saxon values of capitalism and liberalism, Sabahaddin founded the Private Enterprise and Decentralization League, which called for a more decentralized and federal Ottoman Empire in opposition to Rıza's CUP. Prince Sabahaddin believed that the only reason why separatist movements existed amongst Ottoman Armenians was due to the oppressive policies of Abdul Hamid II, and if only the empire would treat its Armenian minority better, then Armenians would become loyal Ottomans. The First Congress of Ottoman Opposition in 1902 Paris was an unsuccessful attempt to bridge the divide amongst the Young Turks and deepened the rivalry between Sabahaddin's group and Rıza's CUP. The 20th century began with Abdul Hamid II's rule secure and his opposition scattered and divided.

Revolutionary Era (1906–1908) 
Despite all these setbacks for the CUP and Young Turks, the committee was effectively revived under a new cadre by 1907. In September 1906, the Ottoman Freedom Committee (OFC) was formed as another secret Young Turk organization based inside the Ottoman Empire in Salonica (modern Thessaloniki). The founders of the OFC were Mehmet Talât, regional director of Post and Telegraph services in Salonica; Dr. Midhat Şükrü (Bleda), director of a municipal hospital, Mustafa Rahmi (Arslan), a merchant from the well known Evranoszade family, and first lieutenants İsmail Canbulat and Ömer Naci. Most of the OFC founders also joined the Salonica Freemason lodge Macedonia Risorta, as Freemason lodges proved to be safe havens from the secret police of Yıldız Palace. Initially the membership of the OFC was only accessible for Muslims, mostly Albanians and Turks, with some Kurds and Arabs also becoming members, but neither Greeks nor Serbs or Bulgarians were ever accepted or approached. Its first seventy members were exclusively Muslims. Army officers İsmail Enver and Kazım Karabekir would found the Monastir (modern Bitola) branch of the OFC, which turned out to be a potent source of recruits for the organization. Unlike the mostly bureaucrat recruits of the Salonica OFC branch, OFC Recruits from Monastir were officers of the Third Army. The Third Army was engaging Greek, Bulgarian, and Serbian insurgent groups in the countryside in what was known as the Macedonian conflict, and its officers believed the state needed drastic reform in order to bring peace to the region that was in seemingly perpetual ethnic conflict. This made joining imperially biased revolutionary secret societies especially appealing to them. This widespread sentiment led the senior officers to turn a blind eye to the fact that many of their junior officers had joined secret societies. Under Talât's initiative, the OFC connected and then merged with Rıza's Paris-based CUP in September 1907, and the group became the internal center of the CUP in the Ottoman Empire. Talât became secretary-general of the internal CUP, while Bahattin Şakir became secretary general of the external CUP. After the Young Turk Revolution, the more revolutionary internal CUP cadre consisting of Talât, Şakir, Dr. Mehmet Nazım, Enver, Ahmed Cemal, Midhat Şükrü, and Mehmed Cavid supplanted Rıza's leadership of the exiled Old Unionists. For now this merger transformed the committee from an intellectual opposition group into a secret revolutionary organization.Intending to emulate other revolutionary nationalist organisations like the Bulgarian Internal Macedonian Revolutionary Organisation and the Armenian Revolutionary Federation, an extensive cell based organisation was constructed. The CUP's modus operandi was komitecilik, or rule by revolutionary conspiracy. Joining the revolutionary committee was by invitation only, and those who did join had to keep their membership secret. Recruits would undergo an initiation ceremony, where they swore a sacred oath with the Quran (or Bible or Torah if they were Christian or Jewish) in the right hand and a sword, dagger, or revolver in the left hand. They swore to unconditionally obey all orders from the Central Committee; to never reveal the CUP's secrets and to keep their own membership secret; to be willing to die for the fatherland and Islam at all times; and to follow orders from the Central Committee to kill anyone whom the Central Committee wanted to see killed, including one's own friends and family. The penalty for disobeying orders from the Central Committee or attempting to leave the CUP was death. To enforce its policy, the Unionists had a select group of especially devoted party members known as fedâi, whose job was to assassinate those CUP members who disobeyed orders, disclosed its secrets, or were suspected of being police informers. The CUP professed to be fighting for the restoration of the Constitution, but its internal organisation and methods were intensely authoritarian, with its cadres expected to strictly follow orders from the "Sacred Committee".

The committee had a secret presence in towns throughout European Turkey. By comparison, the organization was noticeably absent from intellectual circles and army units based in Anatolia and the Levant, Smyrna (İzmir) being an exception. Under this umbrella name, one could find ethnic Albanians, Bulgarians, Arabs, Serbians, Jews, Greeks, Turks, Kurds, and Armenians united by the common goal of overthrowing Abdul Hamid's despotic regime.

In the Second Congress of Ottoman Opposition in 1907 Rıza and Sabahaddin were finally able to put their differences aside and signed an alliance, declaring that Abdul Hamid had to be deposed and the regime replaced with a representative and constitutional government by all means necessary. Since 1907, also non Muslims were able to become members of the OFC. Hence in this alliance was another faction, the Armenian nationalist Armenian Revolutionary Federation (Dashnaktsutyun). The ARF signed the alliance with the hope that decentralizing reforms could be conceded to Ottoman Armenians once the Young Turks took power, even though the CUP's core mantra was centralization. Though Ahmet Rıza eventually pulled out of the tripartite agreement and this alliance played no critical role in the upcoming revolution, the CUP and Dashnak continued a close cooperation throughout the Second Constitutional Era up until 1914.

Young Turk Revolution 

Sultan Abdul Hamid II persecuted the Young Turks in an attempt to hold on to absolute power, but was forced to reinstate the Ottoman constitution, which he had originally suspended in 1878, after threats to overthrow him by the CUP in the 1908 Young Turk Revolution. The revolution was sparked by a summit in July 1908 in Reval, Russia (modern Tallinn, Estonia) between King Edward VII of the United Kingdom and the emperor Nicholas II of Russia. Popular rumour within the Ottoman Empire had it that during the summit a secret Anglo-Russian deal was signed to partition the Ottoman Empire. Though this story was not true, the rumour led the CUP's Monastir branch –which had recruited many army officers– to act. Enver and Ahmed Niyazi fled to the Albanian hinterlands to organise militias in support of a constitutionalist revolution. The Committee threatened Hayri Pasha, field marshal of the Third Army, into passive cooperation, while also assassinating Şemsi Pasha, whom Abdul Hamid had sent to suppress the revolt in Macedonia. At this point, the mutiny which originated in the Third Army in Salonica took hold of the Second Army based in Adrianople (modern Edirne) as well as Anatolian troops sent from İzmir. Under pressure of being deposed, on 24 July 1908 Abdul Hamid capitulated and reinstated the Constitution to great jubilation throughout the Empire.

With the reestablishment of the constitution and parliament, a general election was called for December of that year, prompting most Young Turk organizations to turn into political parties, including the CUP. However, after meeting of the goal reinstating the constitution, in the absence of this uniting factor, the CUP and the revolution began to fracture and different factions began to emerge. Prince Sabahaddin founded the Liberty Party and later in 1911 the Freedom and Accord Party. Most of the Old Unionists soon distanced themselves from a CUP which was a very different organization than how it was originally. Ibrahim Temo and Abdullah Cevdet, two original founders of the CUP, founded the Ottoman Democratic Party in February 1909. Ahmet Rıza returned to the capital from his exile in Paris to be unanimously elected president of the Chamber of Deputies, the parliament's lower house, but by 1910 renounced his membership from the CUP as it became more radical.

Much to the committee's dismay, the instability during the revolution resulted in more territorial loses for the Empire, which would not be reversed due to the European powers refusing to uphold the status quo set by the Treaty of Berlin. Austria-Hungary annexed Bosnia, Crete announced a union with Greece, and Bulgaria declared independence. As a result, the CUP organized a boycott against Austro-Hungarian made goods.

Second Constitutional Era (1908–1913) 

The CUP succeeded in reestablishing democracy and constitutionalism in the Ottoman Empire but chose not to overthrow Abdul Hamid choosing instead to monitor situation from the sidelines. This was because most of its members were younger and held little to no skill in statecraft, while the organization itself held little power outside of Rumelia. Besides, only a small fraction of the army's lower ranking officer corps were loyal to the committee, and total membership numbered around approximately 2,250. The CUP decided to continue its clandestine nature by keeping its membership secret but sent to Constantinople a delegation of seven high-ranking Unionists known as the Committee of Seven, including Talât, Ahmet Cemal, and Mehmed Cavid to monitor the government. After the revolution, power was informally shared between the palace (Abdul Hamid), the Sublime Porte, and the CUP, whose Central Committee was still based in Salonica, and now represented a powerful deep state faction. The CUP's continued reliance on komitecilik quickly earned ire from genuine democrats and prompted accusations of authoritarianism.

An early victory of the CUP over Abdul Hamid happened on 1 August, when Abdul Hamid was forced to assign ministries according to the Central Committee's will. Four days later, the CUP told the government that the current Grand Vizier (at this point a de jure prime ministerial title) Mehmed Said Pasha was unacceptable to them, and had Kâmil Pasha appointed Grand Vizier. Kâmil later proved to be too independent for the CUP. Facing a vote of no confidence, he was forced to resign. He was replaced by Hüseyin Hilmi Pasha who was more partial towards the committee.

Moral was high amongst Ottomans following revolution, but in the lead up to the election, dissatisfaction of the Young Turks' unfulfilled promises to improve worker's rights lead to the first major worker strikes in the Ottoman Empire. The CUP initially supported the strikes to gain more popular support, but soon assisted the government in controlling organized labor by supporting factory owners in their disputes with their workers and sending gendarme and soldiers to crack down on railroad strikes. By October the CUP passed a law that banned workers unions and labor injunctions.

In the Ottoman general election of 1908 the CUP captured only 60 of the 275 seats in the Chamber of Deputies, despite its leading role in the revolution. Other parties represented in parliament included the Armenian Dashnak and Hunchak parties (with four and two members respectively) and the main opposition, Prince Sabahaddin's Liberty Party.

A sign of how the CUP power worked occurred in February 1909, when Ali Haydar who had just been appointed ambassador to Spain went to the Sublime Porte to discuss his new appointment with Hilmi Pasha, only be to be informed by the Grand Vizier he needed to confer with a man from the Central Committee who was due to arrive shortly.

31 March Mutiny and aftermath 

The murder of the anti-Unionist journalist Hasan Fehmi on 6 April was widely seen as an assassination by the CUP. His funeral turned into a demonstration against the committee when a crowd of 50,000 assembled in Sultanahmet Square and eventually in front of the parliament. These events served to be the backdrop of the 31 March Crisis.

Days afterwords, discontent against the CUP and disappointment with renewed constitutionalism culminated in an uprising by reactionaries and liberals. A mob revolted in Constantinople that Abdul Hamid took advantage of, securing his absolutism once again. The members of the Liberty Party that took part in the uprising lost control of the situation when Abdul Hamid accepted the mob's demands, again suspending the constitution and shuttering the parliament in favor of sharia. The uprising was localised in the capital, so MPs and other Unionists were able to flee and organise. Talât was able to escape to Aya Stefanos (Yeşilköy) with 100 deputies to organise a counter government. In the military, Mahmud Şevket Pasha joined forces with Unionist and constitutionalist officers to form the "Action Army" and began a march on Constantinople. Some lower ranking Unionist officers within the formation included Enver, Niyazi, and Cemal, as well as Mustafa İsmet (İnönü) and Mustafa Kemal (Atatürk). Upon the Army of Action arriving at Ayastefanos, it was secretly agreed there that Abdul Hamid would be deposed. Constantinople was taken back within a few days and order was restored through many courts marshals and executions, and the constitution was reinstated for the third and final time. Abdul Hamid II was deposed via a fatwa issued by the Shaykh-al-Islam and a unanimous vote of the Ottoman Parliament. Abdul Hamid's younger brother replaced him and took the name Mehmed V, committing to the role of a constitutional monarch and figurehead of the future CUP party-state. 

While the CUP survived the failed countercoup and saw their ultimate enemy dethroned, their influence was now checked by Mahmud Şevket Pasha, who became the most powerful person in the Ottoman Empire. Şevket Pasha, representing the military, started butting heads with the CUP as he represented the only opposition to them other than the small Ottoman Democratic Party after the 31 March Incident. Prince Sabahaddin's Liberty Party's reluctant support for the counter revolution meant that his party was banned. The Unionists expected more influence in the government for their role in foiling the countercoup, and maneuvered Cavid into the Finance Ministry in June, becoming the first CUP affiliated minister in the government. Two months later, Talât was appointed minister of interior.

CUP and the ARF held a strong alliance throughout the Second Constitutional Era, with their cooperation dating back to the Second Congress of Ottoman Opposition of 1907; as both were united in overthrowing the Hamidian regime for a constitutional one. During the countercoup, massacres against Ottoman Armenians in Adana occurred that was facilitated by members of the local CUP branch, straining the alliance between the CUP and Dashnak. The committee made up for this by nominating Ahmet Cemal as governor of Adana. Cemal restored order, providing compensation to victims and bringing justice to the perpetrators, thus mending the relations between the two committees.

Organizational reform 

In its 1909 congress in Salonica, the Committee of Union and Progress was formally transformed from a conspiracy group into a mass politics organization. A separate parliamentary group from the committee was created, known as the Union and Progress Party, whose membership was open to the public. Though officially unrelated to the CUP, it was very much an instrument of the Central Committee, and the two organizations merged in 1913. Also at the congress Pan-Turkism was introduced in its party program in order to gain the Ottoman Turkic populations support to an eventual union with the other Turkic populations in the world. The committee pledged to discontinue komitecilik characteristics such as initiation ceremonies and other conspiratorial practices and vowed to be more transparent with the public. However, neither the pledge for more transparency nor the pledge to discontinue initiation ceremonies were fully achieved. The committee continued to influence politics in the backrooms and through the occasional assassination (See Ahmet Samim), inviting criticism from many politicians that the committee was opaque and authoritarian rather than a force of democracy. By the end of 1909, Union and Progress was both an organization and a party with 850,000 members and 360 branches spread across the country.

In February 1910 several parties splintered from the Union and Progress Party, including the People's Party, Ottoman Committee of Alliance, and the Moderate Liberty Party.

Near downfall (1911–1913) 
In September 1911, Italy submitted an ultimatum containing terms clearly meant to provoke a rejection, and following the expected rejection, invaded Ottoman Tripolitania. The Unionist officers in the army were determined to resist the Italian aggression, and the parliament had succeeded in passing the "Law for the Prevention of Brigandage and Sedition", a measure ostensibly intended to prevent insurgency against the central government, which assigned that duty to newly created paramilitary formations. These later came under the control of the Special Organisation, which was used to conduct guerrilla operations against the Italians in Libya. Those who once served as fedâiin assassins during the years of underground struggle were often assigned as leaders of the Special Organisation. The ultra-secretive Special Organisation answered to the Central Committee, and in the future worked closely with the Ministry of War and Ministry of Interior. A great many officers, most of whom Unionist, including Enver, his younger brother Nuri, Mustafa Kemal, Süleyman Askerî, and Ali Fethi (Okyar) all departed to Libya to fight the Italians.

With many of the Unionist officers in Libya, this weakened the power of the CUP and the army at home. As a consequence of the Italian invasion, İbrahim Hakkı Pasha's Unionist government collapsed and two more parties splintered from the CUP: the right-wing New Party, and the left-wing Progress Party. Union and Progress was forced into a coalition government with some minor parties under Mehmed Said Pasha. Another blow against the CUP came in mid-November, when all of the opposition parties coalesced around a new big tent party known as Freedom and Accord, which immediately attracted 70 deputies to its ranks.

When it came time for general elections in 1912, held in the midst of the war with Italy and one of many Albanian revolts, the Union and Progress Party and Dashnak campaigned for the elections under an electoral alliance. Alarmed at the success of Freedom and Accord and increasingly radicalised, Union and Progress won 269 of the 275 seats in parliament through electoral fraud and violence, which led to the election being known as the "Election of Clubs", leaving the Freedom and Accord just six seats. Though they received ten seats from the Union and Progress's lists, Dashnak terminated the alliance as they expected more reforms from the CUP as well as more support for their candidates to be elected.

In May 1912, colonel Mehmed Sadık separated from the CUP and organized a group of pro-Freedom and Accord officers in the army calling themselves the Saviour Officers Group, which demanded the immediate dissolution of the Unionist dominated parliament on July 11. The fraudulent electoral result of the "Election of Clubs" had badly hurt the popular legitimacy of the CUP, and faced with widespread opposition and Mahmud Şevket Pasha's resignation as Minister of War in support of the officers, Said Pasha's Unionist government resigned on 9 July 1912. It was replaced by Ahmed Muhtar Pasha's "Great Cabinet" that deliberately excluded the CUP by being made up of older ministers, many of which were associated with the old Hamidian regime. On 5 August 1912, Muhtar Pasha's government shuttered the Unionist dominated parliament and called for snap elections which would never happen due to the outbreak of war in the Balkans. For the moment, the CUP had become isolated, driven from power, and risked being banned by the government.

With the CUP out of power, in the lead up to the elections, the party challenged Muhtar Pasha's government to a jingoistic game of pro-war populism against the Balkan states by utilizing its still powerful propaganda network. Unbeknownst to the CUP, the Sublime Porte, and most international observers, Bulgaria, Serbia, Montenegro, and Greece were already preparing themselves for a war against the Empire in an alliance known as the Balkan League. On 28 September 1912, the Ottoman army conducted military maneuvers on the Bulgarian border, to which Bulgaria responded by mobilizing. On 4 October the Committee organized a pro-war rally in Sultanahmet Square. Finally on 8 October, Montenegro declared war on the Ottoman Empire, starting the First Balkan War, with the rest of its allies joining in during the week. The Ottoman Empire and Italy concluded their war so that the Empire could focus on the Balkan states with the Treaty of Ouchy, in which Tripolitania was annexed and the Dodecanese were occupied by Italy. This proved too little and too late to salvage Rumelia; Albania, Macedonia, and western Thrace was lost, Edirne was put under siege, and Constantinople was in serious risk of being overrun by the Bulgarian army (see First Battle of Çatalca). Edirne was a symbolic city, as it was an important city in Ottoman history, serving as the Empire's third capital for nearly one hundred years, and together with Salonica represented Europe's Islamic heritage.

Muhtar Pasha's government resigned on the 29th of October following total military defeat in Rumelia for Kâmil Pasha's return, who was close to Freedom and Accord and keen on destroying the CUP once and for all. With the loss of Salonica to Greece the CUP was forced to relocate its Central Committee to Istanbul, but by mid-November the new headquarters was shut down by the government and its members were forced into hiding.

1913 coup d'état 

Grand Vizier Kâmil Pasha and his War Minister Nazım Pasha wished to ban the CUP, so the CUP launched a preemptive strike: a coup d'état known as the Raid on the Sublime Porte on 23 January 1913. During the coup Kâmil Pasha was forced to resign as Grand Vizier at gunpoint and a Unionist officer Yakub Cemil killed Nazım Pasha. The coup was justified under the grounds that Kâmil Pasha was about to "sell out the nation" by agreeing to a truce in the First Balkan War and giving up Edirne. The intention of the new leadership, dominated by Talât, Enver, Cemal, under Mahmud Şevket Pasha's premiership (who reluctantly accepted the role), was to break the truce and renew the war against Bulgaria.

The CUP once again did not take over the government, instead opting for the creation of a national unity government; only four Unionist ministers were appointed into the new government. The immediate aftermath of the coup resulted in a much more severe state of emergency than previous governments had ever implemented. Cemal in his new capacity as military commander of Constantinople was responsible for arresting many and heavily stifling opposition. At this point the Unionists were no longer concerned with their actions being considered constitutional.

The pro-war regime immediately withdrew the Empire's delegation from the London conference on the same day it took power. The first task of the new regime was to found the Committee for National Defence on 1 February 1913 which was intended to mobilize the resources of the empire for an all-out effort to turn the tide. On 3 February 1913 the war resumed. In the Battle of Şarköy, the new government staked a daring operation in which XX Army Corps was to make an amphibious landing at the rear of the Bulgarians at Şarköy while the Straits Composite Force was to break out of the Gallipoli peninsula. The operation failed due to a lack of co-ordination with heavy losses.

News of the failure to rescue Rumelia by the CUP prompted the organization of a countercoup by Kâmil Pasha that would overthrow the CUP and bring Freedom and Accord back into power. Kâmil Pasha was put under house arrest on May 28, but the conspiracy continued and aimed to assassinate Grand Vizier Mahmud Şevket Pasha and major Unionists. On June 11, only Mahmud Şevket Pasha was assassinated. Mahmud Şevket Pasha represented the last independent personality in the Empire; with his assassination, the CUP took full control over the country. The power vacuum in the army created by Şevket Pasha's death was filled by the Committee. Any remaining opposition to the CUP, especially Freedom and Accord, was suppressed and their leaders exiled. All provincial and local officials reported to "Responsible Secretaries" chosen by the party for each Vilayet. Mehmed V appointed Said Halim Pasha, an Egyptian royal who was loosely affiliated with the committee, to serve as Grand Vizier until Talât replaced him in 1917. A courts marshal sentenced to death 16 Freedom and Accord leaders, including Prince Sabahaddin who was sentenced in absentia, as he already fled to Geneva in exile.

After surrendering in the First Balkan War, the CUP became fixated on retaking Edirne, while other important issues like economic collapse, reform in Eastern Anatolia, and infrastructure were largely ignored. On 20 July 1913, following the outbreak of the Second Balkan War, the Ottomans attacked Bulgaria and on 21 July 1913 Colonel Enver retook Edirne from Bulgaria, further increasing his status as a national hero. By the terms of the Treaty of Bucharest in September 1913, the Ottomans regained some of the land lost in Thrace during the First Balkan War.

The regime 
The new regime was a dictatorship dominated by a triumvirate that turned the Ottoman Empire into a one party state of Union and Progress, known in history as the Three Pashas Triumvirate. Members of Said Halim Pasha's cabinet, the triumvirate consisted of Talât who returned to the Interior Ministry, Enver who became War Minister, and Cemal who became Naval Minister and de facto ruler of Syria, all of whom soon became Pashas. Some historians say Halil (Menteşe) was a fourth member of this clique. Scholar Hans-Lukas Kieser asserts that this state of rule by a triumvirate is only accurate for the year 1913–1914, and that Talât increasingly became a more central figure within the Union and Progress party state, especially once he also became Grand Vizier in 1917. Alternatively, it is also accurate to call the Unionist regime a clique or even an oligarchy, as many prominent Committeemen held some form of de jure or de facto power. Other than the Three Pashas and Halil, éminence grises such as Dr. Nazım, Bahattin Şakir, Ziya Gökalp, and the party's secretary general Midhat Şükrü at times also dominated the Central Committee without formal positions in the Ottoman government.

The CUP regime was less hierarchically totalitarian than future European dictatorships. Instead of relying on strict and rigid chains of command the regime functioned through the balancing of factions through massive corruption and kickbacks. Individual governors were allowed much autonomy, such as Cemal Pasha's reign of Syria and Mustafa Rahmi's governorship of the Aydin vilayet. Loyalty to the committee was seen more valuable than competence. This lack of rule of law, lack of respect to the constitution, and extreme corruption worsened as the regime aged. The Ottoman Empire's committee regime lasted from 1913 to the empire's surrender in World War I in October 1918.

Nationalist pivot (1913–1914) 
The Macedonian Conflict and its conclusion in the Balkan Wars meant a more public display of Turkish nationalism for the CUP at the expense of Ottomanism. Muslim Albanians did not become any more loyal to the empire after the Young Turk Revolution, whilst the defeat in the First Balkan War had showed that the empire's Christian population were potential fifth columns. In addition, lack of action by the European powers in upholding the integrity of the Empire and the status quo of the Berlin Treaty during the Balkan wars meant to the "sacred committee" that the Turks were on their own. However the CUP lost much respect for the European powers in the reconquest of Edirne considering the European powers demanded Edirne's surrender to Bulgaria in the First Balkan War. This abandonment of Ottomanism was much more feasible due to the new borders of the Empire after the Balkan Wars, inflating the proportion of Turks and especially Muslims in the empire at the expense of Christians.

Rhetoric 

From its end, the triumvirate which dominated the CUP did not accept the outcome of the Balkan wars as final, and a major aim of the new regime was to take back all of the territory which had been lost. A school textbook from 1914 captured the burning desire for revenge:

In the aftermath of the First Balkan War hundreds of thousands of refugees from Rumelia arrived with tales of atrocities committed by the Greek, Montenegrin, Serb and Bulgarian forces. A marked anti-Christian and xenophobic mood settled in amongst many Ottoman Muslims. The CUP encouraged boycotts against Austrian, Bulgarian, and Greek businesses, but after 1913 also against the empire's own Christian and Jewish citizens.

The new regime starting to glorify the "Turkish race" after abandoning the multi-culture ideal of Ottomanism. Particular attention was paid to Turan, the mythical homeland of the Turks that was located north of China. A much greater emphasis was put on Turkish nationalism with the Turks being glorified in endless poems, pamphlets, newspaper articles and speeches as a great warrior nation who needed to recapture their former glory. The chief ideologue of the CUP, Ziya Gökalp, complained in a 1913 essay that "the sword of the Turk and likewise his pen have exalted the Arabs, the Chinese and the Persians" rather than themselves and that the modern Turks "needed to turn back to their ancient past". Gökalp argued it was time for the Turks to start following such great "Turanian" heroes as Attila, Genghis Khan, Tamerlane the Great and Hulagu Khan. As such, the Turks needed to become the dominant political and economic group within the Ottoman Empire while uniting with all of the other Turkic peoples in Russia and Persia to create a vast pan-Turkic state covering much of Asia and Europe. In his poem "Turan", Gökalp wrote: "The land of the Turks is not Turkey, nor yet Turkestan. Their country is the eternal land: Turan". The pan-Turanian propaganda was significant for not being based upon Islam, but was rather a call for the unity of the Turkic peoples based upon a shared history and supposed common racial origins together a pan-Asian message stressing the role of the Turkic peoples as the fiercest warriors in all of Asia. The CUP planned on taking back all of the territory that the Ottomans had lost during the course of the 19th century and under the banner of pan-Turkic nationalism to acquire new territory in the Caucasus and Central Asia. This was the motivation for the Ottoman Empire's entry into World War I, the "pan-Turkic" ideology of the party which emphasized the Empire's manifest destiny of ruling over the Turkic people of central Asia once Russia was driven out of that region.

New institutions 

Right from the time of the 1913 coup d'état, the new government planned to wage a total war, and wished to indoctrinate the entire Turkish population, especially the young people, for it. In June 1913, the government founded the Turkish Strength Association, a paramilitary group run by former army officers which all young Turkish men were encouraged to join. The Turkish Strength Association featured much physical exercise and military training intended to let the Turks become the "warlike nation in arms" and ensure that the current generation of teenagers "who, in order to save the deteriorating Turkish race from extinction, would learn to be self-sufficient and ready to die for fatherland, honour and pride". In May 1914, the Turkish Strength Association was replaced with the Ottoman Strength Clubs, which were very similar except for the fact that the Ottoman Strength Clubs were run by the Ministry of War and membership was compulsory for Turkish males between the ages of 10–17. Even more so than the Turkish Strength Association, the Ottoman Strength Clubs were meant to train the nation for war with an ultra-nationalist propaganda and military training featuring live-fire exercises being an integral part of its activities. Along the same lines was a new emphasis on the role of women, who had the duty of bearing and raising the new generation of soldiers, who had to raise their sons to have "bodies of iron and nerves of steel".The CUP created a number of semi-official organisations such as the Ottoman Navy League, the Ottoman Red Crescent Society and the Committee for National Defence that were intended to engage the Ottoman public with the entire modernisation project by promoting their nationalist and militaristic ways of thinking. Reflecting Colmar Freiherr von der Goltz Pasha's influence, especially his "nation in arms" theory, the purpose of the society under the new regime was to support the military.

In January 1914, Enver became a Pasha and was appointed Minister of War, supplanting the calmer Ahmet İzzet Pasha, which made Russia, especially its Foreign Minister Sergey Sazonov, greatly suspicious. An extensive purge of the army was carried out, with about 1,100 officers including 2 field marshals, 3 generals, 30 lieutenant-generals, 95 major-generals and 184 colonels whom Enver had considered to be inept or disloyal forced to take early retirement.

Absent the wartime atmosphere, the Unionists did not yet purge minority religions from political life; at least 23 Christians joined it and were elected to the fifth parliament in 1914, in which the Union and Progress Party was the only contender. The CUP and Dashnak still maintained cordial relations, and in February 1914 concluded negotiations of the passage of a bipartisan reform package for the eastern provinces which would be administered in cooperation with European inspectorates. However relations with the Hunchaks came to an end when intelligence services revealed a plot by the Hunchakian party of assassinating key leaders of the CUP. Those involved were arrested in 1913, and hanged in June 1915. The reform package also turned out to be stillborn, being abandoned by October once the Ottoman Empire entered World War I.

Early acts of demographic engineering 

Many Unionists were traumatized from the outcome of the Macedonian Question and the loss of most of Rumelia. The winners of the 1877-78 Russo-Turkish war and the First Balkan War applied anti-Muslim ethnic cleansing measures against its citizens, which the CUP reacted with similar fever against the Empire's Christian minorities but on a much greater scale in the future. With the Macedonian Question's conclusion, attention was now given to Anatolia and the Armenian Question. Not wanting Anatolia to turn into another Macedonia, the CUP concluded that Anatolia would become the homeland of the Turks through policies of homogeneity in order to save both "Turkdom" and the empire. The CUP would engage in an "... increasingly radicalized demographic engineering program aimed at the ethno-religious homogenization of Anatolia from 1913 till the end of World War I". To that end, before the Committee's exterminatory anti-Armenian policies, anti-Greek policies were in order. Mahmut Celaleddin (Bayar), who was appointed local secretary of the Union and Progress Party branch of Smyrna (modern İzmir), as well as Talât and Enver Pasha, formulated a terror campaign against the Greek population in the İzmir vilayet with the aim of "cleansing" the area. The purpose of the campaign was described in a CUP document:

The campaign did not proceed with the same level of brutality as did the Armenian genocide during 1915 as the Unionists were afraid of a hostile foreign reaction, but during the "cleansing" operations in the spring of 1914 carried out by the CUP's Special Organisation it is estimated at least 300,000 Greeks fled across the Aegean to Greece. In July 1914, the "cleansing operation" was stopped following protests from the ambassadors to the Porte with the French ambassador Maurice Bompard speaking especially strongly in defence of the Greeks, as well as the threat of war from Greece. In many ways, the operation against Ottoman Greeks in 1914 was a trial run for the operations that were launched against Armenians in 1915.

In September, irregular warfare against Russia on the Caucasian border commenced; the ARF was invited to collaborate in these operations but refused. Only in late September in response to cross-border raids would Russian Foreign Minister Sazonov permit the organisation of Ottoman Armenian irregular volunteer regiments (many Ottoman Armenians fled to Russian Tbilisi at this point).

Cementing ties with Germany 

Following the 1913 coup, the CUP initiated a massive arms-buying spree, buying as many weapons from Germany as possible while asking for a new German military mission to be sent to the empire, which would not only train the Ottoman army, but also command Ottoman troops in the field. In December 1913, the new German military mission under the command of General Otto Liman von Sanders arrived to take command of the Ottoman army. Enver, who was determined to uphold his own power, did not allow the German officers the sort of wide-ranging authority over the Ottoman army that the German-Ottoman agreement of October 1913 had envisioned. At the same time, the Unionist government was seeking allies for the war of revenge it planned to launch as soon as possible. Ahmet İzzet Pasha, Chief of the General Staff recalled: "... what I expected from an alliance based on defence and security, while others' expectations depended upon total attack and assault. Without doubt, the leaders of the CUP were anxiously looking for ways to compensate for the pain of the defeats, which the population blamed on them."

Tensions in Europe rapidly increased as the events of the July Crisis unfolded. The CUP saw the July Crisis as the perfect chance to revise the outcome of the loss of Rumelia in the Balkan wars and the loss of the six vilayets in the Berlin Treaty through an alliance with a European power. With the fall of the Anglophile Kâmil Pasha and Freedom and Accord, Germany took advantage of the situation by reestablishing its friendship with the Ottoman Empire that dated back to the Hamidian Era. It was a small faction within the government and the CUP, first and foremost headed by Talât, Enver, and Halil, that solidified an alliance with Germany with an equally small faction within the German government in the form of Freiherr von Wangenheim that brought the Empire into the First World War.After much politicking by Wangenheim, German influence in the Empire noticeably increased through media acquisitions and increasing presence of the German military mission in the capital. On 1 August 1914, the Empire ordered a partial mobilization. Two days later it ordered a general mobilization. On 2 August, the Ottoman and German governments signed a secret alliance. The purpose of this alliance was to bring the Empire into World War I. On 19 August, another secret alliance with Bulgaria negotiated by Talât and Halil and Bulgarian Prime Minister Vasil Radoslavov was signed. On 2 August Wangenheim informed the Ottoman cabinet that the German Mediterranean squadron under Admiral Wilhelm Souchon was steaming towards Constantinople, known as the famous pursuit of the Goeben and Breslau, and requested that the Ottomans grant the squadron sanctuary once it arrived (which the government gladly obliged to). On 16 August, a phony deal was signed with the Ottoman government supposedly buying the Goeben and Breslau for US$86 million, but with the German officers and crews remaining aboard.

On 21 October, Enver Pasha informed the Germans that his plans for the war were now complete and he was already moving his troops towards eastern Anatolia to invade the Russian Caucasus and to Palestine to attack the British in Egypt. To provide a pretext for the war, Enver and Cemal Pasha (at this point Minister of the Navy) ordered Admiral Souchon to attack the Russian Black Sea ports with the newly christened Yavuz and Midilli and other Ottoman gunboats in the expectation that Russia would declare war in response; the attack was carried out on the 29th. After the act of aggression against his country, Sazonov submitted an ultimatum to the Sublime Porte demanding that the Empire intern all of the German military and naval officers in their service; after its rejection Russia declared war on 2 November 1914. The triumvirate called a special session of the Central Committee to explain that the time for the empire to enter the war had now come, and defined the war aim as: "the destruction of our Muscovite enemy [Russia] in order to obtain thereby a natural frontier to our empire, which should include and unite all the branches of our race". This meeting prompted the Minister of Finance Cavid to resign (though he still retained his seat in the Central Committee and returned to his post in 1917) and greatly infuriated the Grand Vizier Said Halim Pasha. On 5 November, Britain and France declared war on the Empire. On 11 November 1914, Mehmed V, declared war on Russia, Britain, and France. Later that month, in his capacity as Caliph of all Muslims, he issued a declaration of jihad against the Entente ordering all Muslims everywhere in the world to fight for the destruction of those nations.

With the expectation that the new war would free the Empire of its constraints on its sovereignty by the great powers, Talât went ahead with accomplishing major goals of the CUP; unilaterally abolishing the centuries-old Capitulations, prohibiting foreign postal services, terminating Lebanon's autonomy, and suspending the reform package for the Eastern Anatolian provinces that was in effect for just seven months. This unilateral action prompted a joyous rally in Sultanahmet Square.

World War I and genocidal policies (1914–1918) 

Although the CUP had worked with the ARF during the Second Constitutional Era, factions in the CUP began to view Armenians as a fifth column that would betray the Ottoman cause after war with nearby Russia broke out in 1914; these factions gained more power after the 1913 coup d'état. After the Ottoman Empire entered the war, most Ottoman Armenians sought to proclaim their loyalty to the empire with prayers being said in Armenian churches for a swift Ottoman victory; only a minority worked for a Russian victory. In the early months of 1915, the Unionist-controlled press still emphasized the importance of the Armenian nation to the Ottoman war effort. A report presented to Talât and Cevdet (governor of Van Vilayet) by ARF members Arshak Vramian and Vahan Papazian on atrocities committed by the Special Organisation against Armenians in Van created more friction between the two organisations. However, the Unionists were still not yet confident enough to purge Armenians from politics or pursue policies of ethnic engineering.

The CUP pushed the country into the war with the expectation that jihad would spell the collapse of the colonial empires of the Entente, and that the Muslim Turkic peoples of Central Asia would assist the Ottomans with an invasion of the Caucasus and Central Asia. For the most part jihad did not create significant uprisings against the Allied powers. In fact, World War I began badly for the Ottomans. British troops seized Basra and began to advance up the Tigris river, Cemal Pasha's invasion of British Egypt failed, and Enver Pasha's Third Army was annihilated by the Russians in the Battle of Sarikamish. These defeats greatly depressed the committee and ended their pan-Turanist dreams. However, Allied attempts to force the Bosphorus in a naval breakthrough failed on 18 March, improving the confidence of the Unionists. The March 18 started the machinations for plans of a purge of Armenians from Ottoman politics and the economy and ethnic engineering in eastern Anatolia that would be executed in April. The goal of these plans was to realize Türk Yurdu: the Turkification of Anatolia and transforming the Ottoman Empire into a homogeneous Turkish nation state.

Armenian genocide 

After the failure of the Sarikamish expedition, the Three Pashas were involved in ordering the deportations and massacres of about 1 million Armenians and other Christian groups between 1915 and 1918, known to history as the Armenian genocide or the Late Ottoman Genocides. Talât's position as the Interior Minister was key in organising the endeavour. The government would have liked to resume the "cleansing operations" against the Greek minority in western Anatolia, but this was vetoed under pressure from Germany, the Empire's only source of military equipment, as Germany wished for a neutral Greece in the war.

The Special Organisation played a key role in the Late Ottoman Genocides. The Special Organisation, which was made of especially fanatical Unionist cadres, was expanded from August 1914 onward. Talât gave orders that all of the prisoners convicted of the worse crimes such as murder, rape, robbery, etc. could have their freedom if they agreed to join the Special Organisation to kill Armenians and loot their property. Besides the hardened career criminals who joined in large numbers to have their freedom, the rank and file of Special Organisation killing units included Kurdish tribesmen attracted by the prospect of plunder and refugees from Rumelia, who were thirsting for the prospect of revenge against Christians after having been forced to flee from the Balkans in 1912.

In late 1914, Enver Pasha ordered that all Armenians serving in the Ottoman Army be disarmed and sent to labour battalions. In early 1915, Enver ordered the killing of all 200,000 Ottoman Armenian soldiers, who were now disarmed in the labour battalions. On 24 April 1915, Talât sent a telegram to Cemal Pasha (who was governor of Syria) instructing him to deport rebellious Armenians not to Central Anatolia (Konya), as had been done to a previous group which rose up in Zeytun (modern Süleymanlı), but instead to the much more inhospitable deserts of northern Syria. The Syrian deserts end up being the destination of future Armenian deportees. Talât also sent a circular to the governors to execute the arrests of important Dashnak and Hunchak members as well as "important and harmful Armenians known by the government." That night, many of Constantinople's prominent Armenian elites were rounded up, arrested, and killed soon after, including Vramian. Military, provincial, and Unionist commissaries were then dispatched to spread stab-in-the-back myths about Armenians to feed into the spirit of jihad. On 27 May, the legal basis for demographic engineering was enacted in the form of a provisional law that allowed for the government the powers of mass repression and deportation if national security was at risk (Tehcir Law).

Deported Armenians had their property confiscated by the state and redistributed to Muslims or simply snatched by local provincial authorities (such as Central Committee member Mehmet Reşid's governorship in Diyarbekir). Return of property to the deportees was de facto forbidden. By late 1916 most Armenians outside of cities like Constantinople and Izmir lost their private property. In areas where Christian minorities were deported from, the government settled Balkan Muslim refugees to take their place and property. Some local governors stood up to the Central Committee's orders of deportations against Christians such as in Kütahya, İzmir, and Dersim (modern Tunceli), but most resistors were simply replaced by Talât. This program of redistribution of Armenian property, Millî İktisat (national economy), was a core tenet of the CUP's Türk Yurdu project. The deportations, massacres, and confiscation of property that were performed against Armenians and other Christian groups were on a larger scale than ever, but this was not the first of such occurrences. Talât and the CUP hypocritically portrayed their actions in a Hamidian context; just like how Abdul Hamid's pretext for massacres against his own (Armenian) subjects was justified through legal means.

Relations with Jews and Zionists 

In December 1914, Cemal Pasha, encouraged by Şakir, ordered the deportation of all the Jews living in the southern part of Ottoman Syria known as the Mutasarrifate of Jerusalem (roughly what is now Israel) on grounds that most of the Jews came from the Russian Empire, but in reality because the CUP considered the Zionist movement as a threat to the Ottoman state. The deportation order was vetoed by Wangenheim and other members of the Central Committee; Germany's leaders believed that the Jews had vast secret powers, and if the Reich were to assist the Jews in the war, the Jews in their turn would assist the Reich. Within the Central Committee, many had personal Judeophilic sentiments. The CUP had its origins in Salonica, at the time the center of the Jewish world with a Jewish plurality. Some in the committee were even Dönmeh, that is, Muslims with Jewish ancestry, including Cavid and Dr. Nazım, and most in the committee enjoyed cordial relations with contemporary Zionists. In general, most Jews were sympathetic with the Unionist regime, especially those concentrated in urban areas and those outside the empire, and sentiments of an Islamic-Jewish alliance were common. However while the Jews of the Yishuv were not deported, the Ottoman authorities made sure to harass the Jews in various other ways, prompting the creation of the pro-entente NILI resistance network centered around Ottoman Palestine.

As the Allied armies started advancing into Palestine in March 1917, Cemal Pasha ordered the deportation of the Jews of Jaffa, and after the discovery of NILI headed by the agronomist Aaron Aaronsohn who spied for the British out of the fear that Unionists would inflict the same fate on Jews as they did upon Armenians, ordered the deportation of all the Jews. However, the British victories over the Ottomans in the autumn of 1917 with Field Marshal Allenby taking Jerusalem on 9 December 1917 saved the Jews of Palestine from being deported.

Other ethnic groups 
The Assyrian Christian community was also targeted by the Unionist government in what is now known as the Seyfo. Talât ordered the governor of Van to remove the Assyrian population in Hakkâri, leading to the deaths of hundreds of thousands, however this anti-Assyrian policy couldn't be implemented nationally.

Even though many Kurdish tribes played an important role in the Special Organisation's exterminatory operations against Christian minorities, Kurds also found themselves victims of deportation of the government, though not of massacre. Talât outlined that nowhere in the Empire's vilayets should the Kurdish population be more than 5%. To that end, Balkan Muslim and Turkish refugees were prioritised to be resettled in Urfa, Maraş, and Antep, while some Kurds were be deported to Central Anatolia. Kurds were supposed to be resettled in abandoned Armenian property, however negligence by resettlement authorities still resulted in the deaths of many Kurds by famine.

The CUP was against all groups which could potentially demand independence. Cemal Pasha's governance in the multicultural provinces of Greater Syria saw many groups, not just Armenians, be effected by Committee rule (See Seferberlik). During the war, Cemal Pasha famously hung local Syrian notables for treason, which helped facilitate the Arab Revolt against the empire. He also made more judicious use of the Tehcir law (compared to Talât) to selectively and temporarily deport certain Arab families he considered suspicious. Due to the Allied blockade of the region and a lack of supplies for the civilian population, certain parts of Ottoman Syria experienced desperate famine.

The deportations of the Rûm were put on hold as Germany wished for a Greek ally or neutrality, however for the sake of their aliance, German reaction to the deportations of Armenians was muted. The participation of the Ottoman Empire as an ally against the Entente powers was crucial to German grand strategy in the war, and good relations were needed. Following Russian breakthrough in the Caucasus and signs that Greece would side with the Allied powers after all, the CUP was finally able to resume operations against the Greeks of the empire, and Talât ordered the deportation of the Pontus Greeks of the Black Sea coast. Acts of plunder by the Special Organisation and regional authorities occurred in the region around Trabzon, with Topal Osman being an especially infamous figure.

From victory to defeat 

On 24 May 1915, after learning of the "Great Crime", the British, French and Russian governments issued a joint statement accusing the Ottoman government of "crimes against humanity", the first time in history that this term had been used. The British, French and Russians further promised that once the war was won they would put the Ottoman leaders responsible for the Armenian genocide on trial for crimes against humanity. However with the Anglo-Australian-New Zealand-Indian-French forces stalemated in Gallipoli and another Anglo-Indian expedition slowly advancing on Baghdad, the CUP's leaders were not threatened by the Allied threat to bring them to trial. On 22–23 November 1915, General Sir Charles Townshend was defeated in the Battle of Ctesiphon by Nureddin Pasha and Goltz Pasha, thus ending the British advance on Baghdad. On 3 December 1915, what was left of Townshend's force was besieged in Kut al-Amara (his forces surrendered to Halil Pasha five months later). In January 1916, Gallipoli ended in an Ottoman victory with the withdrawal of the Allied forces; this victory did much to boost the prestige of the CUP regime. After Gallipoli, Enver Pasha proudly announced in a speech that the empire had been saved while the mighty British empire had just been humiliated in an unprecedented defeat.

During World War I, while the alliance between the Ottoman Empire and Germany was crucial to the goals of both empires, it stood constantly on tense ground. Both the Unionists and the Wilhelminian elites of Germany shared chauvinistic attitudes against Anglo-Saxon values of democracy and pluralism, as well as more general Anglophobic and Russophobic sentiments. However, the enactment of the Türk Yurdu project through the deportation and extermination of Christian minorities deeply disturbed politicians back in Berlin (though not so much the German military elites).

On 4 February 1917, Said Halim Pasha was finally outmaneuvered from his premiership, and Talât was appointed Grand Vizier, bringing the radical faction of the CUP directly to power, though Said Halim was always a puppet of the Central Committee. When it came to policy, the Union and Progress regime introduced many reforms which peaked in Talât Pasha's administration. Reforms in women's rights and matrimony law, secularization, and education were undertaken, that set the groundwork for the more extensive reforms of Mustafa Kemal Atatürk's regime. When it came to the military, though the withdrawal of Russia from the war and the Treaty of Brest-Litovsk, negotiated and signed by Talât Pasha, was not only a massive success for the CUP but also for the Ottoman-German alliance, it simply delayed conflict. The Ottoman Empire regained the Caucasian provinces (Batumi, Kars, Ardahan) lost in the war against Russia forty years ago, but nothing was guaranteed for the CUP's Turanist ambitions in the Caucasus and Central Asia. The Committee decided to take matters into their own hands. Enver Pasha established the Army of Islam to conquer Baku and its oil fields and potentially fulfill Pan-Turkist dreams in Central Asia. German officers were deliberately excluded from the army group, as the Ottomans were suspicious (correctly) of similar German intentions to occupy Baku. This tension reached a boiling point in the spring of 1918, in an incident where Ottoman and German forces clashed in the area. The Ottomans won the race to Baku when the Army of Islam arrived in September, but by then the Central Powers were losing on all fronts. Both countries capitulated to the Allied powers before relations could deteriorate any further.

Purges and Disintegration (1918–1926) 

As the military position of the Central Powers disintegrated, on 13 October 1918 Talât Pasha's government resigned. On October 30 Marshal Ahmet İzzet Pasha, as the new Grand Vizier, negotiated the Armistice of Mudros. The position of the CUP was now untenable, and its top leaders fled to Sevastopol and scattered from there. During the party's last congress held on 1–5 November 1918, the remaining party members decided to abolish the party, which was severely criticized by the public because of the Empire's defeat. However just a week later the Renewal Party was created, with Unionist assets and infrastructure being transferred over to the new party. It was in turn abolished by the Ottoman government in May 1919. After the war the Allied powers assisted Ottoman officials in purging of the Unionists from the government and army, while the Allies continued advancing into Ottoman territory and occupying land, breaking armistice terms. British forces occupied Constantinople and various points throughout the Empire, and through their High Commissioner Somerset Calthorpe, demanded that those members of the CUP leadership who had not fled be put on trial, a policy also demanded by Part VII of the Treaty of Sèvres formally ending hostilities between the Allies and the Empire. The British carried off 60 high ranking Unionists thought to be responsible for atrocities to Malta, (see Malta exiles), where trials were planned. The new government in the Ottoman Empire, led by a rehabilitated Freedom and Accord Party under Damat Ferid Pasha's premiership and Mehmed VI Vahidettin as Sultan, obligingly arrested over 100 Unionist party and military officials by April 1919 and began a series of trials. The effectiveness of these trials was initially promising, with one district governor, Mehmed Kemal, being hanged on April 10. Two additional Unionists were convicted of crimes against humanity and were hanged, but while a few others were convicted, none completed their prison terms.Much of the Unionist leadership that fled was assassinated between 1920 and 1922 in Operation Nemesis. The ARF sent out assassins to hunt down and kill the Unionists responsible for the Armenian genocide. Minister of the Interior and later Grand Vizier Talât Pasha was gunned down in Berlin by a Dashnak on 15 March 1921. Said Halim Pasha, Talât's predecessor who signed the deportation orders in 1915 was killed in Rome by a Dashnak on 5 December 1921. The commander of the Special Organisation Bahattin Şakir was killed in Berlin on 17 April 1922 by a Dashnak gunman. Another member of the ruling triumvirate, Cemal Pasha was killed on 21 July 1922 in Tbilisi by Dashnaks. The final member of the Three Pashas, Enver Pasha was killed in Central Asia while leading the Basmachi Revolt against the Bolsheviks under the command of ethnic Armenian.

Though most Unionists chose to rally around Mustafa Kemal and his Turkish national movement against the pro-Allies Freedom and Accord government in Constantinople, some Unionists were dissatisfied and Kara Kemal briefly revived the CUP in January 1922. Unionist journalist Hüseyin Cahit declared Union and Progress would not contest the 1923 general election for the Ankara based parliament against Atatürk's People's Party. However, dissatisfied with the secularist policies the Republicans were pushing through, such as the abolition of the Caliphate, Kara Kemal's CUP supported the creation of the Progressive Republican Party, which splintered from the People's Party (which renamed itself to the Republican People's Party). The Progressive Republican Party and the remaining nonconforming Unionists were purged for good following the İzmir Affair, an alleged assassination attempt against Mustafa Kemal. Dr. Nazım, Mehmed Cavid, and Ismail Canbulat met their ends in the subsequent Independence Tribunals with Kara Kemal committing suicide before his execution. With opposition quashed, Atatürk consolidated his power and continued ruling Turkey until his death in 1938.

İttihadism

Legacy

Turkey 

Most leaders of the Turkish National Movement and to that extent, individuals associated with Atatürk's Republican People's Party (CHP) (which continued one-party-rule) were former Unionists. Presidents of the Republic of Turkey Mustafa Kemal Atatürk, İsmet İnönü, and Celal Bayar, were members of Union and Progress. CUP Central Committee members Ziya Gökalp, Halil Menteşe, Midhat Şükrü Bleda, and Rahmi Arslan managed to integrate themselves within the new post-Ottoman regime. Other important Republican Turkish figures formerly associated with the CUP included Rauf Orbay, Fethi Okyar, Kâzım Karabekir, Adnan Adıvar, Şükrü Kaya, Çerkez Ethem, Bekir Sami, Yusuf Kemal, Celaleddin Arif, Ahmet Ağaoğlu, Recep Peker, Şemsettin Günaltay, Hüseyin Avni, Mehmet Emin Yurdakul, Mehmet Akif Ersoy, Celal Nuri İleri, Ali Münif Yeğenağa, Yunus Nadi Abalıoğlu, Falih Rıfkı Atay, and others. When Bülent Ecevit became leader of CHP in 1972, he was first general secretary of the party not previously affiliated with the CUP (and born in the Republic of Turkey). His leadership transformed the party into a social democratic force in Turkish politics, which the party stays faithful to, to this day.

Most historians from Turkey write of the period Union and Progress was in power using the lens of Kemalist historiography, which asserts that the Ottoman Empire and the Republic of Turkey are two distinct countries, and that the Committee of Union and Progress and the Republican People's Party feature no relation to each other. However due to the commonalities of various personnel and governing ideologies, opponents of Kemalist Historiography assert that a continuity does exist between the Unionists which took power in the 1913 coup d'état and the Republicans which lost power in Turkey's first multi-party election in 1950; therefore Turkey, as both a constitutional monarchy and as a republic, was in a state of continuous one-party dictatorship between those years.

In addition to Atatürk's Republican People's Party, Union and Progress also has at times been identified with the two opposition parties that Atatürk attempted to introduce into Turkish politics against his own party in order to help jump-start multiparty democracy in Turkey, namely the Progressive Republican Party and the Liberal Republican Party. While neither of these parties was primarily made up of persons indicted for genocidal activities, they were eventually taken over (or at least exploited) by persons who wished to restore the Ottoman caliphate. Consequently, both parties were required to be outlawed, although Kazim Karabekir, founder of the PRP, was eventually rehabilitated after the death of Atatürk by İnönü and even served as speaker of the Grand National Assembly of Turkey.

It was Karabekir who crystallised the modern Turkish position on the Armenian genocide, telling Soviet peace commissioners that the return of any Armenians to territory controlled by Turks was out of the question, as the Armenians had perished in a rebellion of their own making. Historian Taner Akçam has identified four definitions of Turkey which have been handed down by the first Republican generation to modern Turks, of which the second is "Turkey is a society without ethnic minorities or cultures." While the postwar reconstruction of eastern Europe was generally dominated by Wilsonian ideas of national self-determination, Turkey probably came closer than most of the new countries to ethnic homogeneity due to the subsequent population exchanges with neighbouring countries (e.g. population exchange between Greece and Turkey).

Atatürk was particularly eager that Islamism be marginalised, leading to the tradition of secularism in Turkey. This idea was culminated by the CUP in its more liberal heyday, as it was one of the first mass movements in Turkish history that abandoned political Islam.

Muslim World 

The Young Turk Revolution and CUP's work had a great impact on Muslims in other countries. The Persian community in Istanbul founded the Iranian Union and Progress Party. Indian Muslims imitated the CUP oath administered to recruits of the organisation.

Europe 
Considered the world's first one-party state, the CUP regime set an example for future one party regimes, especially in interwar Europe.

Elections

Chamber of Deputies

Congresses

In exile 

 1902: Congress of Ottoman Libertarians
 1907: Second Young Turk Congress

Secret 

 1908
 1909
 1910
 1911

Public 

 1912
 1913
 1916
 1917
 1918

See also 

 Tanin (newspaper)
 Kemalism
 Persecution of Muslims during Ottoman contraction
 Persecution of Christians in the later Ottoman Empire
 List of Ottoman grand viziers of the Second Constitutional Era

References

Citations

Bibliography 
 .
 Akın, Yiğit (2018). When the War Came Home: The Ottomans' Great War and the Devastation of an Empire. Stanford: Stanford University Press. .
 .
 .
 
 .
 
 
 .
 .

 .
 
 
 .
 
 .
 .
 

 .
 .
 .

 .
 .
 .

External links 
 Committee of Union and Progress Turkey in the First World War website

 
Political parties established in 1889
1889 establishments in the Ottoman Empire
Political parties in the Ottoman Empire
Parties of one-party systems
Young Turks
Armenian genocide
Turkish nationalism
Pan-Turkism
Turanism